Laureola is a genus of woodlice, a land crustacean isopod of the family Armadillidae.

Species 
The following species are accepted within Laureola:

 Laureola bivomer 
 Laureola canberrensis 
 Laureola dubia 
 Laureola hiatus 
 Laureola indica 
 Laureola longispina 
 Laureola miacantha 
 Laureola paucispinosa 
 Laureola rubicunda 
 Laureola silvatica 
 Laureola vietnamensis

References

Further reading
 Schmalfuss, H. 2003. World catalog of terrestrial isopods (Isopoda: Oniscidea). Stuttgarter Beiträge zur Naturkunde, Serie A Nr. 654: 341 pp.

Woodlice
Crustaceans described in 1960